Beithabbak (Aramaic-Phoenician name), is a small village in the district of Byblos in Lebanon.

History

The family's presence in Beithabbak dates from early times when their ancestors and their fathers established themselves. Six main families in the village of Abidaoud, Ferjan, Akl, Osabios and Jbeili. The Sakr family recently immigrated from Ghalboun village. The Hobeika, Habbaki family and Azar families left Beithabbak sometimes in the early 17th century.

Other names include Beit Habbak, Habbaki, Habbak, Hebbaki, Hebbak, Hibbak, Hibbaki, Hbaika, Hbeiki, Hbeikati, Habbeikat, Hbbak, Hobeika.

Demography
There are 310 inhabitants in the village. The inhabitants are Maronite Christians. Some part of the population has emigrated to Latin America Brazil, France, Canada, Switzerland, Lithuania and United States. Many are currently resident in USA, Canada and Brazil.

Schools
There is one school in the village, the Missionary Sisters of the Very Holy Sacrament school.

Churches 

There are Six chapels in the village:
Saint Antonio, a small grotto chapel located inside cliff monastery in the eastern part of the village.
Saint Mary, a small main church which can host 80 persons, located in the central square of the village.
Saint Sarkis a small chapel near village Christian events hall and cemetery.
Missionary Sisters of the Very Holy Sacrament Chapel located inside the school.
Saint Simon, a small grotto chapel located between Beithabbak and Abaidat inside cliff monastery
Akl family small private chapel built earlier by their member Bishop Akl.

The chapels of Saint Antonio and Saint Simon dates from the beginning of the 19th century. One can notice its small entrance doors which are typical of churches in the area. These were designed to prevent Ottoman cavaliers from bursting inside with their horses.

The priest responsible for the Beithabbak Churches is newly assigned Father by Bishop of Byblos, based in Amsheet.

Climate 
Beithabak has a unique Mediterranean climate characterized by a hot and virtually rain-free very long summer of eight-month, pleasant green fall and spring, and cool, rainy winter. August is the hottest month of the year while January and February are the coldest.
The average annual rainfall is approximately 900 millimeters, virtually all of which falls in winter, autumn and spring. Much of the rain in autumn and spring falls on a limited number of days in heavy downpours. In winter, however, the rain is more evenly spread over many days. Summer receives very little rainfall most of the years none. Snow in Beithabak is very rare and usually occurs without accumulation.

Etymology  

The name Beithabak comes from the Phoenician root open house hall, meaning "The beloved house of all". The village hall for all family members, friends, relatives, neighbors, visitors, and tourist are welcomed in this small beloved village hall house.

Beithabak Club  

Beithabak Club is a sport, social and cultural club offering recreational sports facilities to its members: shooting, basketball, soccer, volleyball, table tennis, camping and a gym. It is mostly active during summer season when it hosts national and regional tournaments.
The town is the site of the annual village small festival, held in the church square it raises funds for community renovation and other needs.

Geography  
Beithabak occupies a hill, 500–650 meters above sea level, which gives the town views of the part of Lebanon's Mediterranean coast, the lower mountain surrounding range the valley corridors in between all the way to the horizon of the Mediterranean Sea. Very remote location between the Holy Saints pilgrimage sites of Lehfed, Anaya and the city of Byblos, overseeing the lower mountain range and the upper mountain range including the ancient Phoenician waterway to the south of the village as the ancient highway transporting the cedar wood from the Jaje ancient cedar park to Byblos port.

Tourism 
The town has historic Maronite Monastery of Saint Anthony and St. Simon, Beithabak is a summer resort in Lebanon with a landmark. Pine forests, oak forests, olive trees and grape surround the village. Hills with views of the valleys and the sea make Beithebak a favorite summer spot.
Beithabak always attracted the Lebanese youth scout camp in summer time from Beirut, would typically involve outdoor activities such as camping in the local pine forest, hiking, and other team-building exercises. Participants would learn survival skills, leadership, and cooperation while also experiencing Lebanese culture through traditional food, music, and dance. Safety precautions such as sunscreen, insect repellent, and hydration would also be emphasized due to the hot summer weather.
A Christian Maronite spiritual youth camp would likely involve activities centered around faith in Beithabak monastery every summer, personal reflection, and building a strong spiritual foundation. Participants would engage in prayer, meditation, and spiritual discussions led by religious leaders and experienced mentors. The camp may also involve community service projects, Bible study sessions, and workshops on personal growth and development. In addition to these activities, there may also be outdoor activities and team-building exercises to promote fellowship and camaraderie among campers.

Origin  
Since little has survived of Phoenician records or literature, most of what is known about their origins and history comes from the accounts of other civilizations and inferences from their material culture excavated throughout the Mediterranean.
The Canaanite culture that gave rise to the Phoenicians apparently developed in this heart land on the east cost of the Mediterranean sea from the land of the cedars, the ancient Phoenicia and modern Lebanon.

Notable people  

•	Cordelia Abidaoud – Phoenician princes 

•	Tony Abidaoud – Author

See also 

 Phoenicia
 Maronite
 Lebanon
 Beit Mary
 Beitedine
 Bethsaida
 Beithlehem
 Sea of Galilee Boat
 New Testament places associated with Jesus

References

Populated places in Byblos District
Maronite Christian communities in Lebanon